This is a list of vice admirals in the United States Navy from 2010 to 2019. The rank of vice admiral (or three-star admiral) is the second-highest rank normally achievable in the U.S. Navy, and the first to have a specified number of appointments set by statute. It ranks above rear admiral (two-star admiral) and below admiral (four-star admiral).

There have been 120 vice admirals in the U.S. Navy from 2010 to 2019, 20 of whom were promoted to four-star admiral. All 120 achieved that rank while on active duty in the U.S. Navy. Admirals entered the Navy via several paths: 75 were commissioned via the U.S. Naval Academy (USNA), 27 via Naval Reserve Officers Training Corps (NROTC) at a civilian university, five via Officer Candidate School (OCS), four via Aviation Officer Candidate School (AOCS), four via direct commission (direct), one via NROTC at a senior military college, one via the U.S. Air Force Academy (USAFA), and one via direct commission inter-service transfer from the United States Army (USA).

List of admirals
Entries in the following list of vice admirals are indexed by the numerical order in which each officer was promoted to that rank while on active duty, or by an asterisk (*) if the officer did not serve in that rank while on active duty. Each entry lists the admiral's name, date of rank, active-duty positions held while serving at three-star rank, number of years of active-duty service at three-star rank (Yrs), year commissioned and source of commission, number of years in commission when promoted to three-star rank (YC), and other biographical notes.

Timeline

2010–2019

History

Civil War

The grade of vice admiral in the United States Navy was created by Congress in December 1864 to honor David G. Farragut for his victory at the Battle of Mobile Bay during the American Civil War. The promotion made Farragut the senior officer in the Navy but did not give him command of all naval forces, unlike the corresponding grade of lieutenant general that had been revived for Ulysses S. Grant earlier that year. After the war, Farragut was promoted to admiral and his vacated vice admiralcy was filled by David D. Porter. When Farragut died in 1870, Porter succeeded him as admiral and Stephen C. Rowan became vice admiral. Three years later, Congress stopped further promotions to admiral or vice admiral, and the vice admiral grade expired with Rowan in 1890.

After the Spanish-American War, Congress tried to revive the grade to reward William T. Sampson and Winfield S. Schley for winning the Battle of Santiago de Cuba, but the officers feuded bitterly over credit for the victory and their partisans in the Senate could not agree on who would be the senior vice admiral, so neither was promoted. Even after Sampson died in 1902, his admirers continued to prevent Schley from being promoted, while Schley's friends blocked all moves to elevate any other officer over him during his lifetime, such as an attempt to promote Robley D. Evans to vice admiral on the retired list in 1909. No new vice admirals were created until after Schley's death in 1911.

World War I

In 1915, Congress authorized the President to designate the commanders in chief of the Pacific, Atlantic, and Asiatic Fleets to hold the rank of admiral, and their seconds in command the rank of vice admiral. The chief of naval operations (CNO) received the rank of admiral the following year. Because Porter and Rowan had been promoted permanently to vice admiral and then never gone to sea again, Congress made these new ranks strictly ex officio. Upon relinquishing command, an officer lost his designation as admiral or vice admiral and reverted to his permanent grade of rear admiral. The three fleet commanders were immediately made admirals to match the rank of their foreign counterparts, but only the second in command of the Atlantic Fleet, Henry T. Mayo, was designated a vice admiral, since the Pacific and Asiatic Fleets were too small to employ their vice admirals.

When the United States entered World War I, Congress generalized the law to let the President designate up to six commanders of any fleet or subdivision of a fleet to hold ranks higher than rear admiral, of which up to three could be admirals and the rest vice admirals. This allowed William S. Sims to be designated vice admiral as commander of U.S. Naval Forces in European Waters. The other two vice admiral designations went to the Atlantic Fleet's two battleship force commanders. When the Asiatic Fleet's commander in chief retired in December 1918, his four-star designation was transferred to Sims, whose vacated vice admiralcy went to Albert Gleaves, commander of the Atlantic Fleet's cruiser and transport force. By the end of 1918, all three seagoing admirals and all three vice admirals were assigned to the Atlantic and European theaters, including the four-star commander in chief of the Pacific Fleet, who had taken a force to patrol the South Atlantic Ocean.

With the end of hostilities in Europe, the six designations for admirals and vice admirals were redistributed in 1919. The commanders in chief of the Atlantic and Pacific Fleets remained admirals. About half of the major ships in the Atlantic Fleet transferred to the Pacific Fleet, which was now large enough to employ a vice admiral to command its battleship force. A second vice admiral commanded the battleship force of the Atlantic Fleet, and a third vice admiral, Gleaves, commanded its cruiser and transport force. The sixth designation returned to the Asiatic Fleet when Sims left his European command, but its commander in chief, William L. Rodgers, was promoted only to vice admiral since Gleaves was already slated to be its admiral, so for a few months there were four vice admirals and only three admirals, including the CNO.

In September 1919, Gleaves was appointed commander in chief of the Asiatic Fleet with the rank of admiral. Rodgers remained vice admiral in command of Division 1 of the Asiatic Fleet until January 1920, so for the first and only time, the Pacific, Atlantic, and Asiatic Fleets each had an admiral and vice admiral, as originally envisioned in 1915.

Interwar

In 1922 the three fleets were combined into a single United States Fleet with three admirals and three vice admirals. One admiral served as commander in chief of the United States Fleet (CINCUS), a second admiral as commander in chief of the Asiatic Fleet, and the third admiral as commander in chief of the former Pacific Fleet, now the Battle Fleet. A vice admiral commanded the former Atlantic Fleet, now the Scouting Fleet, and a second vice admiral commanded the battleship divisions of the Battle Fleet. The Battle Fleet and Scouting Fleet became the Battle Force and Scouting Force, respectively, when the United States Fleet was reorganized into type commands in 1931. When the Pacific and Atlantic Fleets were reconstituted in February 1941, CINCUS was dual-hatted as commander in chief of the Pacific Fleet (CINCPAC), and the commander in chief of the Atlantic Fleet was made an admiral by downgrading the Battle Force's commander to vice admiral and its battleship commander to rear admiral.

The third vice admiral designation moved from the Asiatic Fleet to the commander of U.S. Naval Forces in European Waters in 1920 and lapsed when the European force was disbanded in 1929. It was revived the next year for the commander of the Scouting Fleet's light cruiser divisions and subsequently the Scouting Force's cruisers, before migrating in 1935 to the commander of the Battle Force's aircraft.

A flag officer in the United States Fleet climbed a cursus honorum that nominally began with command of a battleship division as a rear admiral, followed by command of all battleship divisions in the Battle Force as a vice admiral, then command of the entire Battle Force as an admiral, and finally either CINCUS, the highest office afloat, or CNO, the highest office ashore—or both, in the case of William V. Pratt. Upon leaving the fleet, it was normal for a former three- or four-star commander to revert to his permanent grade of rear admiral and remain on active duty until statutory retirement as president of the Naval War College, commandant of a naval district, or member of the General Board.

Since there were four admirals and only three vice admirals, it was not uncommon to skip the rank of vice admiral entirely, especially for commanders in chief of the Asiatic Fleet, which was seen as a four-star consolation prize for flag officers who were out of the running for CINCUS or CNO. By the early 1940s, neither the CNO (Harold R. Stark), CINCUS (Claude C. Bloch, James O. Richardson), nor CINCPAC (Husband E. Kimmel, Chester W. Nimitz) had ever been a vice admiral.

World War II

In July 1941, Congress authorized the President to designate, at his own discretion, up to nine additional officers to carry the ex officio rank of vice admiral while performing special or unusual duty, for a total of 12 vice admirals in the permanent establishment. The first of the nine new vice admiral designations was assigned to Robert L. Ghormley, then serving as special observer in the U.S. Embassy in London. After the United States entry into World War II in December 1941, the new commander in chief of the Atlantic Fleet, Royal E. Ingersoll, was designated a vice admiral after his predecessor, Ernest J. King, was appointed commander in chief of the United States Fleet (COMINCH, formerly CINCUS) and took the Atlantic Fleet's four-star designation with him. The remaining seven vice admiral slots were quickly filled by the director of the Office of Procurement and Material and the commanders of U.S. Naval Forces, Southwest Pacific; ANZAC Force; the service forces in the Atlantic and Pacific Fleets; and two anti-submarine task forces in the Atlantic Fleet.

All 12 vice admiral designations were in use by March 1942, when a headquarters reorganization called for two more vice admirals to be vice chief of naval operations and chief of staff to COMINCH. Frederick J. Horne and Russell Willson were nominated to be temporary vice admirals, under a 1941 statute that authorized an unlimited number of appointments in all grades for temporary service during a national emergency, with temporary flag officers needing confirmation by the Senate. The statute technically created temporary grades only up to rear admiral, but the Senate confirmed Horne and Willson as vice admirals anyway, and continued to confirm temporary admirals and vice admirals when nominated. Dozens of temporary vice admirals were appointed during World War II, either to serve in a specified job or simply for the duration of the national emergency.

Postwar

The Officer Personnel Act of 1947 consolidated the various laws governing vice admiral appointments. Previously, the President had controlled a pool of 12 vice admiral designations that he could assign at his own discretion. In addition, the Senate could confirm an unlimited number of officers nominated by the President to hold the temporary personal grade of vice admiral, either while serving in a particular job or for the duration of a national emergency. Under the new law, all vice admirals had to be confirmed by the Senate, and held that temporary grade only while serving in a particular job. The maximum number of vice admirals was proportional to the total number of flag officers.

The new law also made any former admiral or vice admiral eligible to retire with that rank, simplifying the hodgepodge of rules that had promoted various classes of retirees piecemeal. Originally every designated admiral and vice admiral retired in his permanent grade of rear admiral. In 1930 Congress promoted officers on the retired list to their highest rank held during World War I, which was defined as having ended on July 2, 1921, so John D. McDonald, who became vice admiral on July 1, 1921, was promoted, but William R. Shoemaker, who became vice admiral only a week later, was not. In 1942 former fleet commanders were allowed to retire as admiral or vice admiral if they had served in that grade for at least a year, a cutoff that John H. Dayton and Walter R. Sexton both missed by about two weeks. Dayton lived long enough to be advanced back to vice admiral by the Officer Personnel Act of 1947, but Sexton did not.

Postwar vice admirals typically headed directorates in the Office of the Chief of Naval Operations, numbered fleets, type commands, sea frontiers, senior educational institutions like the National War College and the Naval War College, or other interservice or international positions. Upon completing their capstone assignments, many senior flag officers resumed the prewar pattern of remaining on active duty in a lower grade until statutory retirement, in contrast to Army and Air Force general officers who usually preferred to retire immediately to avoid demotion. For example, Lynde D. McCormick reverted from vice admiral to rear admiral but rose again to vice admiral and admiral before dropping to vice admiral for his final assignment.

Tombstone promotions

In 1925 Congress authorized Navy and Marine Corps officers who had been specially commended for performance of duty in actual combat during World War I to retire with the rank of the next higher grade but not its pay. Such honorary increases in rank at retirement were dubbed tombstone promotions, since their only tangible benefit was the right to carve the higher rank on the officer's tombstone. Later laws expanded eligibility beyond World War I and to officers already on the retired list. Tombstone promotions were limited in 1947 to duty performed before the end of World War II, meaning before January 1, 1947, and halted entirely in 1959. By May 29, 1959, there were 154 vice admirals on the retired list who had never served on active duty in that rank, not counting those already deceased.

Dozens of vice admirals received tombstone promotions to admiral. Even if a vice admiral reverted to rear admiral, he could still retire as a vice admiral and then claim a tombstone promotion to admiral, but only if he had satisfactory service in the temporary grade of vice admiral during World War II. For example, Gerald F. Bogan, David W. Bagley, Robert C. Giffen, and Alexander Sharp Jr. all reverted to rear admiral after serving as a vice admiral, and all qualified for a tombstone promotion, but only Bagley was advanced to admiral when he retired.
 Bogan was confirmed by the Senate to be a temporary vice admiral while commanding the First Task Fleet after World War II, but offended the secretary of the Navy during the so-called Revolt of the Admirals and was relieved of his three-star command only three weeks before he was scheduled to retire with a tombstone promotion to admiral. Instead, he reverted to rear admiral and received a tombstone promotion back to vice admiral.
 Bagley was confirmed by the Senate to be a temporary vice admiral while serving in a succession of jobs during World War II, before reverting to rear admiral. He retired in his highest wartime grade of vice admiral and received a tombstone promotion to admiral.
 Giffen was confirmed by the Senate to be a temporary vice admiral while commanding the Caribbean Sea Frontier during World War II, but was reprimanded for misconduct in that role. Having unsatisfactory service as a vice admiral, he retired as a rear admiral and received a tombstone promotion back to vice admiral.
 Sharp was designated by the President to hold the rank of vice admiral while commanding the Service Force, Atlantic Fleet during World War II, but was never confirmed by the Senate to hold the temporary personal grade of vice admiral, unlike Bagley and Giffen. Sharp retired with his highest active-duty rank of vice admiral but was not advanced to admiral because tombstone promotions were based on personal grades, not designated ranks.

Modern use

There are presently 27 permanent three-star billets in the United States Navy. These positions include commanders of numbered fleets as well as high-level type and geographic commands, including the commanders of the naval submarine forces, naval surface forces, naval information forces and the chief of navy reserve. Heads of Navy staff corps such as the judge advocate general and (customarily) the surgeon general are also vice admirals. The superintendent of the United States Naval Academy has been a three-star vice admiral without interruption since John R. Ryan's tenure began in 1998.

As with any other service branch, vice admirals can hold joint assignments, of which there are 20 to 30 at any given time. Among the most prestigious of them is the director of the Joint Staff (DJS), principal staff advisor to the chairman of the Joint Chiefs of Staff and historically considered a stepping stone to four-star rank. All deputy commanders of the unified combatant commands are of three-star rank, as are directors of Defense Agencies not headed by a civilian such as the director of the Defense Intelligence Agency (DIRDIA). Internationally-based three-star positions include the United States military representative to the NATO Military Committee (USMILREP) and the commander of Joint Force Command - Norfolk (JFC-NF). All nominees for three-star rank must be confirmed via majority by the Senate before the appointee can take office and thus assume the rank.

Statutory limits, elevations and reductions

The U.S. Code states that no more than 27 officers in the U.S. Navy may be promoted beyond the rank of rear admiral and below the rank of admiral on the active duty list, with the exception of those on joint duty assignments. However, the President may designate up to 15 additional three-star appointments, with the condition that for every service branch allotted such additional three-star appointments, an equivalent number must be reduced from other service branches. Other exceptions exist for non-active duty or reserve appointments, as well as other circumstances. As such, three-star positions can be elevated to four-star grade or reduced to two-star grade where deemed necessary, either to highlight their increasing importance to the defense apparatus (or lack thereof) or to achieve parity with equivalent commands in other services or regions.

Several three-star positions have been created, consolidated, or even eliminated entirely between 2010 and 2019.
 The warfighting development (OPNAV N7) directorate was stood up in October 2019 to develop and disseminate naval strategy and implement it in tandem with naval training and education efforts. Rear Admiral Stuart B. Munsch was promoted to vice admiral to become the first deputy chief of naval operations for warfighting development.

 The warfare systems (OPNAV N9) directorate was stood up in 2012 for validating and integrating requirements and resources for manpower, training, sustainment safety and modernization of manned and unmanned warfare systems of the U.S. Navy, with Vice Admiral William R. Burke as its inaugural commander.
 The surgeon general of the Navy (SGN), a vice admiral's billet since 1965 was reduced to a rear admiral's billet after the 2017 National Defense Authorization Act struck the statutory ranks of heads of restricted/limited-duty communities. Rear Admiral Bruce L. Gillingham, the first Navy surgeon general since passage of the Act, assumed office on October 1, 2019.
 The Naval Information Forces (NAVIFOR), established in 2014 as a two-star command was elevated to a three-star command in July 2017. Then-NAVIFOR commander, Rear Admiral Matthew J. Kohler was promoted to vice admiral on July 6, 2017.
 United States Second Fleet (COMSECONDFLT) was disestablished and re-established in 2011 and 2018.
 In September 2011, Second Fleet was disestablished and merged with the U.S. Fleet Forces Command as a cost-saving measure. COMSECONDFLT's directorship of the Combined Joint Operations from the Sea Center of Excellence (CJOS COE), held since 2006, was transferred to the deputy commander of U.S. Fleet Forces Command.
 Facing maritime competition from Russia, Second Fleet was formally re-established on August 24, 2018 as a strategic countermeasure. Its new commander, Vice Admiral Andrew L. Lewis was dual-hatted as Joint Force Command - Norfolk (JFC-NF) from June 2018, and re-assumed the directorship of CJOS COE in October 2020.

Senate confirmations

Military nominations are considered by the Senate Armed Services Committee. While it is rare for three-star or four-star nominations to face even token opposition in the Senate, nominations that do face opposition due to controversy surrounding the nominee in question are typically withdrawn. Nominations that are not withdrawn are allowed to expire without action at the end of the legislative session.
 For example, the nomination of Rear Admiral Elizabeth L. Train for promotion to vice admiral and assignment as director of naval intelligence and deputy chief of naval operations for information warfare was withdrawn in April 2016 in favour of Vice Admiral Jan E. Tighe, then-commander of U.S. Fleet Cyber Command and Tenth Fleet. Tighe was confirmed in May 2016 and assumed office in July 2016.
 The nomination of Major General Ryan F. Gonsalves for promotion to lieutenant general and assignment as commanding general of U.S. Army Europe was withdrawn in November 2017 after an investigation was launched into the general's inappropriate comment to a female Congressional staffer. As a result, Gonsalves was administratively reprimanded and retired in May 2018.

Additionally, events that take place after Senate confirmation may still delay or even prevent the nominee from assuming office.
 For example, Major General John G. Rossi, who had been confirmed for promotion to lieutenant general and assignment as the commanding general of the U.S. Army Space and Missile Defense Command in April 2016 committed suicide two days before his scheduled promotion and assumption of command. As a result, the then incumbent commander of USASMDC, Lieutenant General David L. Mann, remained in command beyond statutory term limits until another nominee, Major General James H. Dickinson was confirmed by the Senate.
 Vice Admiral Scott A. Stearney assumed command of U.S. Naval Forces Central Command, Fifth Fleet, and Combined Maritime Forces in May 2018. His death in December of the same year resulted in the speedy confirmation of Rear Admiral James J. Malloy in the same month for appointment to three-star rank as his replacement.

Legislative history

The following list of Congressional legislation includes all acts of Congress pertaining to appointments to the grade of vice admiral in the United States Navy from 2010 to 2019.

Each entry lists an act of Congress, its citation in the United States Statutes at Large or Public Law number, and a summary of the act's relevance, with officers affected by the act bracketed where applicable. Positions listed without reference to rank are assumed to be eligible for officers of three-star grade or higher.

See also
 List of active duty United States four-star officers
 List of active duty United States three-star officers
 List of United States Navy vice admirals on active duty before 1960
 List of United States Navy vice admirals from 2000 to 2009
 List of United States Navy vice admirals since 2020
 List of United States Coast Guard vice admirals
 List of United States Public Health Service Commissioned Corps vice admirals
 List of United States military leaders by rank
 List of United States Navy four-star admirals
 Vice admiral (United States)

References

Notes

Bibliography

External links
 
 

 
United States Navy
United States Navy admirals
United States Navy admirals
Admirals